Obuh is a surname. Notable people with the surname include:

John Obuh (born 1960), Nigerian footballer and coach